Reginald Horace Fuller (1915–2007) was an Anglo-American biblical scholar, ecumenist, and Anglican priest. His works are recognized for their consequential analysis of New Testament Christology. One aspect of his work is on the relation of Jesus to the early church and the church today. For this, his analysis, which uses the historical-critical method, has been described as neo-orthodox.

Life events 
Reginald Fuller was born on 24 March 1915.  An obituary from the University of Wales Trinity Saint David noted that "Fuller was the son of Horace Fuller, an agricultural engineer, and his wife Cora Lottie née Heath. He came from Horsham in West Sussex, where he attended Collyer’s School. He was a choir boy in his local parish church between the ages of nine and fifteen."    

He later attended Peterhouse at the University of Cambridge (BA, 1937), first-class honours, Classical Tripos I and Theological Tripos II; MA, 1942). He studied at the University of Tübingen, Germany, in 1938–1939. He prepared for ministry in the Church of England at the Queen's College, Birmingham (1939–1940), and was ordained a deacon in 1940 and a priest in 1941. He met Ilse Barda in 1940 at a wedding. They married in 1942. Fuller was a curate in England from 1940 to 1950 and lectured in theology at the Queen's College, 1946–1950. He was professor of theology and Hebrew at St David's College, Lampeter, Wales (1950–1955). He also assisted in raising three daughters.

Fuller became a US resident in 1955. He was professor of New Testament at Seabury-Western Theological Seminary, Evanston, Ill., languages and literature (1955–1966), Union Theological Seminary  and Columbia (adj.), NYC (1966–1972), and  Virginia Theological Seminary, Alexandria (1972–1985; adj., 1994–2002). Fuller was also visiting professor at nine other seminaries or colleges in the United States, Canada, and Australia: University of the South, Sewanee, Tenn. (1960, ..., 1988, 7 terms), Graduate Theological Union, Berkeley, Ca. (1975), College of Emmanuel and St. Chad, Saskatoon, Sask., Canada (1978), Union Theological Seminary, Richmond, Va. (1985), Episcopal Theological Seminary of the Southwest, Austin, Tx. (1986), Nashotah House, Wis. (1986, ..., 2004, 7 terms), St. Mark's College of Ministry, Canberra, Australia (1987), and Wesley Theological Seminary, Washington, DC (1990).

Fuller was a member of World Council of Churches study commissions (1957–1961), Episcopal–Lutheran Conversations (1969–1972, 1977–1980), Anglican–Lutheran Conversations (1970–1972), and Lutheran–Catholic (US) Dialogue Task Force (1971–1973), and the New Revised Standard Version Bible Translation Committee (1981–2006).

Fuller authored some twenty books and over 100 journal articles or book chapters. He also translated such works as Bonhoeffer's The Cost of Discipleship (1948) and Letters and Papers from Prison (1953), Jeremias's Unknown Sayings of Jesus (1957), Bultmann's Kerygma and Myth, 2 v. (1953 & 1962) and Primitive Christianity (1956), Schweitzer's Reverence for Life (with Ilse Fuller) (1969), and Bornkamm's The New Testament:  A Guide to Its Writings (1973).

Fuller died on 4 April 2007 in Richmond, Virginia, one day before his 92th birthday.

Honours
Fuller was a fellow of the American Association of Theological Schools, 1961–1962. He was president of Studiorum Novi Testamenti Societas, 1983-84  He was recipient of the first annual Ecumenism Award from the Washington Theological Consortium (2001) and of honorary degrees from among others General Theological Seminary (STD), Philadelphia Divinity School (STD), and Seabury-Western Theological Seminary (DD).

Fuller became Professor Emeritus at Virginia Theological Seminary in 1985.

In 1990, his former students presented  a festschrift in his honour. 
 
Fuller became an American citizen in 1995. He was an honorary canon of Cathedral Church of St. Paul in Burlington, Vermont, and Priest in Residence at Emmanuel Church at Brook Hill, Richmond, Va.

Fuller was survived by his wife Ilse Barda Fuller, his daughters, Caroline Sloat and Sally Fuller, four grandchildren; and five great-grandsons.

The New York Times obituary recorded Fuller's belief that the Bible must be proclaimed every Sunday. It closed by noting that, "On March 25, the day he suffered the fall that eventually led to his death, he taught a Sunday school class on the Resurrection."

The Foundations of New Testament Christology 
Reginald H. Fuller's treatise, The Foundations of New Testament Christology (1965), illustrates aspects of his scholarly publications. The book defines key terms, states assumptions, describes the method used, and develops implications in cumulative fashion. Thus, 'Christology' (the doctrine of Jesus Christ's person) refers to a response to a particular history, not the action of God in Jesus as such nor the history itself. Analysis of New Testament Christology begins with the disciples' belief in the resurrection. It is concerned with "what can be known of the words and works of Jesus" and how these were interpreted. 'Foundations of New Testament Christology' is foundational in referring to presuppositions of NT writers rather than to the theology of their finished product (pp. 15–17). The book considers the response of the early church as to conceptual tools available in successive environments of Palestinian Judaism, Hellenistic Judaism, and the Graeco-Roman gentile world. "What can be known" of the historical Jesus and the early church's mission depends on critical methods and tests applied to documents from the gentile mission. Such methods and tests distinguish the knowledge of early writers about Jesus, their own theology, and other traditions to which they responded (pp. 17–20). The book makes explicit which elements of sources are accepted as going back to each stratum of the early church. It accepts assignment of a tradition to a specific stratum with:
 elaboration in case of wide acceptance
 a summary of the argument in case wide acceptance is lacking
 elaboration in case a common assignment is rejected or a new assignment is proposed (p. 21).
With the emergence of a post-Bultmann school of "historical-traditio criticism", the concern of the book is "to establish a continuity of the historical Jesus and the christological kerygma of the post-resurrection church." The real continuity, Fuller felt, "was obscured, if not actually denied, by Bultmann's own work", to the disadvantage of the church's proclamation (p. 11).

The book concludes that the christological foundations of the early church (as recoverable from the New Testament and formulations of church fathers) "are also the foundations of Christology today" (p. 257).

Selected publications

Books
 - 1960, 2nd ed.

  __ (1964). The New Testament in Current Study. SCM Press. Reviewed by  Burton H. Throckmorton Jr. (1964). [Review untitled] "The New Testament in Current Study by Reginald H. Fuller," The Journal of Religion 44(1}, p. 79.

Chapters or entries

Journal articles

See also
 The Myth of God Incarnate

Notes

References
 Arland J. Hultgren and Barbara Hall, ed., 1990. Christ and His Communities:  Essays in Honor of Reginald H. Fuller, Forward Movement.  (Also contains CV, publications list through 1989, & an intimate introductory essay by Ilse Fuller on R.H.F.:  the man, churchman, & scholar.)
 Who's Who in America 2006, p. 1596.
 Raymond E. Brown, 1990. "Christology" and "The Resurrection of Jesus," in Raymond E. Brown et al., ed., The New Jerome Biblical Commentary, Prentice Hall, pp. 1354–1359, 1373–1377.
 The Rev. Steve Schlossberg, 2007. "To Evensong: Reginald Horace Fuller+, 1915–2007," The Missioner. Michaelmas, pp.7-9 (numbered). A remembrance.
 Douglas Martin, 2007. "Reginald H. Fuller, 92, New Testament Scholar, Dies," The New York Times, April 14.
 Ellen Robertson, 2007. "The Rev. R.H. Fuller, 92, Dies After a Fall," Richmond Times-Dispatch, April 6.
 Mary Rourke, 2007. "Reginald Fuller, 92; Biblical Scholar," Los Angeles Times, April 18.
 2007. "Reginald H. Fuller, Former VTS Professor, Dies at 92",  Episcopal Life Online, April 18.
 Jeremy Davies, 2007. "Reginald Fuller - A Theologian of Stature," The Salisbury Journal, May 24.* Jeremy Davies, 2007. "Reginald Fuller - A Theologian of Stature," The Salisbury Journal, May 24.
 2007. "Reginald H. Fuller 1915–2007," SBL Forum, April.
 2007. "Canon Reginald Horace Fuller," Church Times, May 11.

1915 births
2007 deaths
20th-century American Episcopalians
20th-century American theologians
20th-century Christian biblical scholars
20th-century English theologians
20th-century American translators
Academics of the University of Birmingham
Academics of the University of Wales, Lampeter
Alumni of Peterhouse, Cambridge
Alumni of the University of Birmingham
American biblical scholars
American Episcopal theologians
Anglican biblical scholars
British biblical scholars
English Anglican theologians
English emigrants to the United States
English translators
New Testament scholars
People from Horsham
People in Christian ecumenism
Translators of the Bible into English
Union Theological Seminary (New York City) faculty
University of Tübingen alumni
Virginia Theological Seminary faculty